Stereocaulon alpinum is a species of fungus belonging to the family Stereocaulaceae. It is similar to Stereocaulon paschale but differs from it in containing cyanobacteria of the genus Nostoc while S. paschale contains cyanobacteria of the genus Stigonema, which have a darker colour than Nostoc.

Ecology
Stereocaulon alpinum is a known host species to lichenicolous fungi, which are pathogenic or commensal species living on the surface or in the thallus of the lichen. These include:

 Arthonia stereocaulina
 Catillaria stereocaulorum
 Cercidospora stereocaulorum
 Diploschistes muscorum
 Endococcus nanellus
 Lasiosphaeriopsis stereocaulicola
 Lichenopeltella stereocaulorum
 Lichenosticta dombrovskae
 Merismatum decolorans
 Opegrapha stereocaulicola
 Polycoccum trypethelioides
 Rhymbocarpus stereocaulorum
 Scutula stereocaulorum
 Stigmidium beringicum
 Taeniolella christiansenii

References

Stereocaulaceae